A pocket protector is a sheath designed to hold writing instruments and other small implements in a shirt's breast pocket, protecting it from tearing or staining. It may be used to carry pens, pencils, screwdrivers, small slide rules, and other small items. A flap over the outside of the pocket helps to secure the pocket protector. Pocket protectors were originally made of polyvinyl chloride (PVC).

Invention
The pocket protector was invented during World War II by Hurley Smith while he was working in Buffalo, New York. He was awarded  for the device on March 18, 1947; the patent was filed on June 3, 1943. 

A competing claim for the invention came from Long Island plastics magnate Gerson Strassberg around 1952. Strassberg was working on plastic sleeves for bankbooks. One day he placed one that he was working on into his shirt pocket while he took a phone call. When he noticed it there, he realized it would make a great product.

Use

Pocket protectors imprinted with logos or company names were first marketed to companies as promotional merchandise. A more general market soon arose, made up of students, engineers, and white-collar workers in a variety of fields. They have become part of a "nerd" or "geek" fashion stereotype, probably because of their association with engineers or students.

Notes

References
 Slatalla, Michelle. "Classic Nerdwear; Pocket Protector, Image Projector". New York Times 24 June 1999.

External links
 
 Webseum of Pocket Protectors 

Fashion accessories